CBCS may refer to:
 CBCS (cable system) or Cameroon-Brazil Cable System, a planned transatlantic submarine communications cable.
 Comic Book Certification Service, a comic book grading service based in St. Petersburg, Florida.
 Consortium of Bangsamoro Civil Society, a network of Moro civil society organizations in Mindanao.
 CBCS-FM, a radio station (99.9 FM) licensed to Sudbury, Ontario, Canada
 CBCS-TV-1, a television station (channel 8) licensed to Meadow Lake, Saskatchewan, Canada, rebroadcasting CKSA-TV Lloydminster
 Chevaliers Beneficient De La Cité-Sainté, one of the three schools of Martinism
 Chinese Bible Church of Springfield, a non-denominational Christian church
 Opus-CBCS, a Fidonet Bulletin Board system
 Choice Based Credit System, a course credit system for undergrad students in India